Keiseria is a genus of flies in the family Stratiomyidae.

Distribution
Madagascar.

Species
Keiseria amoena Lindner, 1966
Keiseria fasciata Lindner, 1966
Keiseria lunaris Lindner, 1968
Keiseria praescutellata Lindner, 1966
Keiseria rubicunda Lindner, 1966

References

Stratiomyidae
Brachycera genera
Taxa named by Erwin Lindner
Diptera of Africa
Endemic fauna of Madagascar